Lachlan Murray Cameron (born 12 April 1959) is a former New Zealand rugby union player. A second five-eighth and centre, Cameron represented Manawatu and Counties at a provincial level, and was a member of the New Zealand national side, the All Blacks, from 1979 to 1981. He played 17 matches for the All Blacks including five internationals.

References

1959 births
Living people
Rugby union players from Hamilton, New Zealand
People educated at Hamilton Boys' High School
Massey University alumni
New Zealand rugby union players
New Zealand international rugby union players
Manawatu rugby union players
Counties Manukau rugby union players
Rugby union centres